Lowndes County is a county on the eastern border of the U.S. state of Mississippi. As of the 2020 United States Census, the population was 58,879. Its county seat is Columbus. The county is named for U.S. Congressman and slave owner William Jones Lowndes.

Lowndes County comprises the Columbus, MS Micropolitan Statistical Area. Since the late 20th century, it has been designated as one of three counties in the Golden Triangle region of the state.

History
This upland area was settled by European Americans who wanted to develop cotton plantations to produce what became the largest commodity crop in the state.

In the period from 1877 to 1950, Lowndes County had 19 documented lynchings of African Americans, third to Carroll and Leflore counties, which had 29 and 48, respectively. This form of racial terrorism was at its height in the decades around the turn of the 20th century, which followed the state's disenfranchisement of most blacks in 1890 through creating barriers to voter registration.

Geography
Lowndes County lies on the east side of Mississippi, bordering the U.S. state of Alabama. Its terrain was completely wooded before settlement; at present its more level areas have been cleared and turned to agricultural or urban use, with the drainages (about 40% of the total area) still wooded. The Tennessee−Tombigbee Waterway flows south-southeastward through the center of the county, with a significant lock system (John C. Stennis Lock and Dam) near Columbus.
The county's highest point ( ASL) is a small rise near the county's NE corner.

Major highways

  U.S. Highway 45
  U.S. Route 45 Alternate
  U.S. Highway 82
  Mississippi Highway 12
  Mississippi Highway 50
  Mississippi Highway 69
  Mississippi Highway 182

Adjacent counties

 Noxubee County - south
 Oktibbeha County - west
 Clay County - northwest
 Monroe County - north
 Lamar County, Alabama - northeast
 Pickens County, Alabama - southeast

Demographics

2020 census

As of the 2020 United States Census, there were 58,879 people, 22,436 households, and 14,654 families residing in the county.

2010 census
As of the 2010 United States Census, there were 59,779 people in the county. 54.0% were White, 43.5% Black or African American, 0.7% Asian, 0.2% Native American, 0.1% Pacific Islander, 0.6% of some other race and 1.1% of two or more races. 1.5% were Hispanic or Latino (of any race).

2000 census
As of the 2000 United States Census, there were 61,586 people, 22,849 households, and 16,405 families in the county. The population density was 123 people per square mile (47/km2). There were 25,104 housing units at an average density of 50 per square mile (19/km2). The racial makeup of the county was 56.47% White, 41.56% Black or African American, 0.17% Native American, 0.54% Asian, 0.03% Pacific Islander, 0.39% from other races, and 0.85% from two or more races. 1.11% of the population were Hispanic or Latino of any race.

There were 22,849 households, out of which 36.50% had children under the age of 18 living with them, 49.20% were married couples living together, 18.70% had a female householder with no husband present, and 28.20% were non-families. 24.60% of all households were made up of individuals, and 8.90% had someone living alone who was 65 years of age or older. The average household size was 2.61 and the average family size was 3.13.

The county population contained 28.60% under the age of 18, 10.60% from 18 to 24, 29.20% from 25 to 44, 20.40% from 45 to 64, and 11.20% who were 65 years of age or older. The median age was 33 years. For every 100 females there were 89.90 males. For every 100 females age 18 and over, there were 84.20 males.

The median income for a household in the county was $32,123, and the median income for a family was $38,248. Males had a median income of $31,792 versus $20,640 for females. The per capita income for the county was $16,514. About 18.00% of families and 21.30% of the population were below the poverty line, including 31.80% of those under age 18 and 16.80% of those age 65 or over.

Education

Primary and secondary schools
Portions of Lowndes County are served by the Columbus Municipal School District, Lowndes County School District, and the Mississippi Association of Independent Schools – Lowndes County Division.

The Columbus Municipal School District includes:

 Columbus High School
 Columbus Middle School
 McKellar Technology Center
 Joe Cook Elementary Fine Arts Magnet School
 Fairview Elementary Aerospace and Science Magnet School
 Franklin Academy Elementary Medical Sciences and Wellness Magnet School
 Sale Elementary International Studies Magnet School
 Stokes-Beard Elementary Communication and Technology Magnet School
 Columbus Alternative School

The Lowndes County School District has three areas, each with an elementary school, a middle school, and a high school
 Caledonia Schools
 New Hope Schools
 West Lowndes Schools
The Mississippi Association of Independent Schools – Lowndes County Division has provided five private and parochial schools for Lowndes County
 Heritage Academy High School
 Heritage Academy Elementary School
 Columbus Christian Academy
 Victory Christian Academy
 Annunciation Catholic School

Colleges and universities
Mississippi University for Women is located in Columbus. Lowndes County is within the service area of the East Mississippi Community College system. The Golden Triangle Campus is located in Mayhew, an unincorporated area in Lowndes County. The system also offers classes at the Columbus Air Force Base Extension in Columbus.

Communities

City
 Columbus (county seat)

Town
 Artesia
 Caledonia
 Crawford ("Crawfordsville" 1852–1870; "Crawfordville 1870–1879)

Census-designated places
 Columbus Air Force Base
 New Hope

Unincorporated communities

 Bent Oak
 Billups
 Flint Hill
 Forreston
 Kolola Springs
 Mayhew
 McCrary
 Penns
 Plum Grove
 Steens
 Trinity
 Wells
 Whitebury
 Woodlawn
Hill City

Ghost towns
 Moores Bluff
 Nashville
 Plymouth

Politics

See also
 National Register of Historic Places listings in Lowndes County, Mississippi

References

 
Mississippi counties
Counties of Appalachia
1830 establishments in Mississippi
Populated places established in 1830
Majority-minority counties in Mississippi